Arcuri Overthrow is a Venezuelan experimental metal band based in Valencia, Venezuela. The band was formed in 2002 in Valencia by the brothers Arcuri: bassist Felipe and drummer Vicente, with the original name Black Rainbow. It's the first Venezuelan metal band, only with bass and drums.

History

Its members are the brothers Arcuri: Felipe (bass player of the Venezuelan heavy metal band Arkangel, one of the most legendary and successful bands in the Latin American rock scene) and Vicente (drummer of the Venezuelan heavy metal band Gillman), who in 2002, founded an experimental project, originally called Black Rainbow, the first metal band in Venezuela, only with bass and drums, replacing guitars with bass guitar, and adding electronic sequences executed under the MIDI environment. That year, they had a unique performance at the Festival Nuevas Bandas (a musical contest that features newborn bands of different genres from all over the country), capturing the attention and applause of the audience, but the project remained in pause, due to the multiple commitments of the Arcuri brothers with their other activities. Meanwhile, they kept accumulating experience, rehearsing and creating themes. 

From 2011, the project, initially called Black Rainbow, evolves and happens to be call Arcuri Overthrow, and they recorded several singles, compiled in an EP called "Inicio", with the participation of some Latin American rock stars, between them: Elkin Ramírez singer of Colombian hard rock band Kraken, and Hugo Bistolfi keyboardist of Argentine heavy metal band Rata Blanca. Besides, they also collaborated: Andrew Vincze (Venezuelan vocalist of the Hungarian/Venezuelan progressive metal band Progness), and the string ensemble Akashiaft.

2016, brings as new members of the group to: the 'Princess of the National Rock' of Venezuela, the girl Fiorella Arcuri, Vicente's daughter, and Felipe's niece, in the voices, and Luis Loyo, on bass. Rubén Hernández and Luis Loyo perform as musical producers, along with the Arcuri brothers, who are the executive producers of the band too.

In 2017, the band is recording their first album, which has the participation of several guests from the Latin American rock scene.

Band members
 Felipe Arcuri – bass, backing vocals
 Vicente Arcuri – drums
 Fiorella Arcuri – backing vocals
 Luis Loyo – bass, backing vocals

Discography

EP 
 Inicio (2011)

References

External links
Official website
Felipe Arcuri Official website
Vicente Arcuri Official website
Felipe Arcuri in Encyclopaedia Metallum
Vicente Arcuri in Encyclopaedia Metallum

Musical groups established in 2002
Venezuelan musical groups
Venezuelan rock music groups